The 2004 Philippine presidential and vice presidential elections were held on Monday, May 10, 2004. In the presidential election, incumbent president Gloria Macapagal Arroyo won a full six-year term as President, with a margin of over one million votes over her leading opponent, movie actor Fernando Poe Jr.

The elections were notable for several reasons. This election first saw the implementation of the Overseas Absentee Voting Act of 2003 (see Wikisource), which enabled Filipinos in over 70 countries to vote. This is also the first election since the 1986 People Power Revolution where an incumbent president ran for re-election. Under the 1987 Constitution, an elected president cannot run for another term. However, Arroyo was not elected president, but instead succeeded ousted President Joseph Estrada, who was impeached with charges of plunder and corruption in 2000 and later convicted of plunder (but received conditional pardon from Arroyo).

Moreover, this elections was the first time since 1986 that both the winning president and vice president were under the same party/coalition; this instance will be later repeated in 2022 when Bongbong Marcos and Sara Duterte under the same political coalition was elected president and vice president, respectively.

This election was also held at a period in modern Philippines marked by serious political polarization. This resulted in lesser candidates for the presidential and vice presidential elections compared to the 1992 and 1998 elections.

Background
The political climate leading up to the 2004 elections was one of the most emotional in the country's history since the 1986 elections that resulted in the exile of Ferdinand Marcos. Philippine society has become polarized between the followers of former president Joseph Estrada who have thrown their support for Estrada's close associate Fernando Poe, Jr. and those who support incumbent Gloria Macapagal Arroyo, or at best oppose Estrada.

The several months leading to the May elections saw several presidential scandals, Arroyo reversing her earlier decision not to run for president, the sudden but not unexpected candidacy of Fernando Poe, Jr., defection of key political figures from the Arroyo camp to the opposition, the controversial automated elections initiative of the COMELEC, and the split of the dominant opposition party, Laban ng Demokratikong Pilipino, between Poe and Panfilo Lacson.

Gloria Macapagal Arroyo's candidacy

On a speech given on Rizal Day, December 30, 2002, Gloria Macapagal Arroyo declared that she would not run in the 2004 elections. She said that withdrawing from the race would relieve her of the burden of politics and allow her administration to devote the last year and half to
strengthening the economy healing the deep divisions within Philippine society, and working for clean and honest elections in 2004.

However, on October 4, 2003, Arroyo said that she would seek a full-term presidency, saying that her change of heart was for a higher cause, and that she could not ignore the call to further  serve the country.

Fernando Poe, Jr.'s candidacy

Months before the elections, members of the opposition were encouraging actor Fernando Poe, Jr., a close friend of former president Joseph Estrada to run for president. Poe was very popular with the masses and it was widely believed that he would be a sure winner if he ran for president.

On November 27, 2003, Poe announced during a press conference held at the Manila Hotel that he would run for president.

However, on January 9, 2004, Victorino X. Fornier (a private citizen) filed a case against Poe and the COMELEC, saying that Poe was not eligible to run as he was not a natural-born Filipino before the COMELEC. On January 23, the COMELEC dismissed the petition for lack of merit. On February 10, Fornier finally filed the case to the Supreme Court, seeking for Poe to be disqualified from the race. His case was later merged with cases filed by Maria Jeanette C. Tecson, and Felix B. Desiderio, Jr., and by Zoilo Antonio G. Velez.

Death of Lawyer Maria Jeanette Tecson

On September 28, 2007, 8:30 p.m, Senior Superintendent Francisco Uyami, Pasig police chief stated that lawyer Maria Tecson, 40, had been found dead (in a state of rigor mortis) inside room 204 at the Richmond Hotel, San Miguel Avenue, Pasig (with her throat slit and with cuts on her wrist). Maria Jeanette Tecson, Zoilo Velez (promoted to Court of Appeals Justice) and Victorino Fornier filed the disqualification case against Fernando Poe, Jr. She claimed Poe was born out of wedlock, and that while Poe's birth certificate was dated 1939, his parents Allan Poe and American mother Bessie Kelly did not marry until 1940.

On March 3, the Supreme Court, said in its decision that for lack of jurisdiction and prematurity, and ruling that Poe's father, Allan F. Poe would have been a Filipino citizen by virtue of the en masse Filipinization enacted by the Philippine Bill of 1902. Also, even if Poe had not been a natural-born Filipino citizen, he could not be held guilty of having made a material misrepresentation in his certificate of candidacy.

Eddie Gil's candidacy
The Commission on Elections originally affirmed the candidacies of six people for the president. The sixth person running for president was Eduardo "Eddie" Gil. The party of Eduardo Villanueva filed a petition with the COMELEC seeking to disqualify Eddie Gil on the basis of him being a nuisance candidate, his incapacity to mount a nationwide campaign, and that because he was running with the aim to confuse voters because of their similar names.

Eddie Gil claims to be an international banker having a net worth of billions of dollars. His platform for presidency promised to make every Filipino a millionaire within his first 100 days of being elected. He also promised to pay off the Philippines' debt, worth trillions of pesos, from his own pocket. This was widely ridiculed, especially after a recent incident in which a check he had issued to pay his hotel bills during a campaign sortie, bounced.

The LDP split
The Laban ng Demokratikong Pilipino party (LDP) would form the core of the main opposition party, the Koalisyon ng Nagkakaisang Pilipino (KNP). However, members of the party disagreed on which person to support for president. Panfilo Lacson, a member of the party, advanced his candidacy for president but was not considered by Edgardo Angara, the president of the party. Angara supported Fernando Poe, Jr. Together with the party's secretary-general Agapito "Butz" Aquino, Lacson gathered the support of some members of the party and went ahead with his candidacy. The LDP was subsequently polarized between those supporting Angara and Poe, and those for Lacson and Aquino.

By then, Poe and Lacson have both filed their certificates of candidacies for president. According to the rules of candidacy, every presidential candidate must have a political party to back him or her. With the obvious split within the ranks of the LDP, and with no signs that the two factions would come to an agreement, the COMELEC decided to informally split the party into the Aquino and the Angara wings. Lacson then ran under the LDP - Aquino Wing, and Poe under the LDP - Angara Wing, which would later become the KNP.

During the campaign period, there had been numerous unification talks between the two factions. The opposition saw the need to become united under one banner to boost their chances of winning the presidential election against the organized political machinery of Arroyo. The plans of unification did not materialize due to the stubbornness of both Poe and Lacson. Lacson wanted Poe to concede to him and run as his vice-presidential candidate while the supporters of Poe wanted Lacson to back out from his candidacy and instead support Poe, citing his low performance in the surveys.

COMELEC's move for an automated elections
Elections in the Philippines have always been a manual process with the results for national positions often being announced more than a month after election day. An attempt to rectify this was done by the Commission on Elections by automating the process of counting the votes. More than 30 billion pesos were spent in acquiring counting machines that were never used in this elections because of numerous controversies and political opposition.

Parties and coalitions
This election has seen strong shifts of alliances and new parties as candidates switched allegiances. The two major coalitions seen in this elections were the K-4 (Koalisyon ng Katapatan at Karanasan sa Kinabukasan), of the administration, and the KNP (Koalisyon ng Nagkakaisang Pilipino), the united opposition.

Koalisyon ng Nagkakaisang Pilipino (KNP)
The Koalisyon ng Nagkakaisang Pilipino (Coalition of United Filipinos), or KNP, is the coalition of the united opposition. Its standard bearers are Fernando Poe, Jr. for president and Sen. Loren Legarda for vice-president. The leading parties of this coalition is the Laban ng Demokratikong Pilipino (LDP-Angara Wing), the PDP–Laban and the Pwersa ng Masang Pilipino. the LDP split is caused by stubbornness between FPJ and Ping Lacson.  especially with the support of the former president Joseph Estrada and former first lady Imelda Marcos. The other major party under this coalition is Estrada's Partido ng Masang Pilipino (PMP, Party of the Filipino Masses).

Alyansa ng Pag-asa
The third major coalition running in this election is the Alyansa ng Pag-asa (Alliance of Hope), This coalition fielded Raul Roco for president and Herminio Aquino for vice-president. The three major parties supporting this coalition are Roco's Aksyon Demokratiko (Democratic Action), former Defense Sec. Renato de Villa's Reporma Party, and Lito Osmeña's Promdi (Probinsya Muna [Provinces First] Development Party). The three parties were the ones that bolted out of the People Power Coalition.

Bangon Pilipinas Movement (BPM)
The Bangon Pilipinas (Rise up, Philippines) Movement is the political party of Bro. Eddie Villanueva. It consists mostly of volunteers, a majority of whom came from Villanueva's Jesus Is Lord church (Villanueva resigned from the church before submitting his candidacy, to prevent questions on separation of church and state).

Laban ng Demokratikong Pilipino (LDP) (Aquino Wing)
A faction named after the party's secretary-general Butz Aquino, this was composed of Panfilo Lacson's supporters in the LDP Party.

Partido Isang Bansa, Isang Diwa
This was Eddie Gil's organization. Gil was deemed a nuisance candidate and was disqualified from the presidential race, however, the party qualified for other positions.

Candidates

Opinion polling

President

Vice president

Results
The official results of the election were released in staggered dates with most winners in local elective positions declared within two weeks from the May 10 election date. The winners in the Senatorial and Party-list Representative elections were declared on May 24, with the exception of the 12th senator which was announced on June 3. The results of the presidential and vice-presidential races were finalized by the Congress on June 20, more than a month after the elections. Out of the 43,895,324 registered voters, about 33.5 million ballots were cast giving a voter turn-out of 76.34%.

Shown below are the official tallies of the Presidential and Vice-Presidential races.

President

Vice-President

Legarda v. De Castro electoral protest
On January 18, 2008, in a 21-page resolution, penned by Senior Justice Leonardo Quisumbing, the Supreme Court of the Philippines, acting as the Presidential Electoral Tribunal (PET), dismissed Sen. Loren Legarda's electoral protest against Noli de Castro. 3 reasons supported the judgment: first, the PET approved the recommendation of Hearing Commissioner and former Commission on Elections (Comelec) Chair retired SC Justice Bernardo P. Pardo that “the pilot-tested revision of ballots or re-tabulation of the certificates of canvass would not affect the winning margin of the protestee in the final canvass of the returns, in addition to the ground of abandonment or withdrawal by reason of Protestant’s candidacy for, election and assumption of the office Senator of the Philippines;” second, Legarda's failure to pay the P 3.9 million ($1 = P 40) revision of ballots (in 124,404 precincts) fee despite court extension under Rule 33 of the PET; and third, jurisprudence of Defensor Santiago v. Ramos, teaches that Legarda "effectively abandoned or withdrawn her protest when she ran in the Senate, which term coincides with the term of the Vice-Presidency 2004-2010." Meanwhile, Noli De Castro on television stated: "This is the triumph of truth. The truth that I won fair and square. I thank the Supreme Court for echoing the true voice of the people. From the very beginning I was confident that I received the overwhelming mandate of our people as Vice President." Legarda stated that she will file a motion for reconsideration in due course.

Exit polls
During and immediately after the elections, exit polls were conducted by various organizations including the Social Weather Stations. According to "The SWS 2004 Day of Election Survey: Final Exit Poll Scores Excluding Blank Answers", released by the SWS on 19 May 2004, the national vote percentages are: GMA 45%, FPJ 34%, Lacson 10%, Roco 6%, Villanueva 5% (slightly different numbers from May 11; error margin 2%, n = 4,445)."

These results are affirmed when compared to the NAMFREL Quick Count as of May 21, as tabulated in "Comparison of ABS-CBN/SWS Exit Poll 2004 Results (as of May 17, 9 am; excluding No Answer) and NAMFREL Quick Count as of May 21 1:00 p.m. (Report #63)". The NAMFREL Quick Count shows GMA at 40.4%, FPJ at 36.5%, Lacson at 10.8%, Roco at 6.2%, and Villanueva at 6.1%.

It is notable in light of the subsequent Hello Garci scandal how exit polling revealed the candidates' performance in the Autonomous Region in Muslim Mindanao. To wit, the SWS exit poll shows that GMA won only 44% of ARMM while FPJ won 50% (in short, 44–50);  the NAMFREL Quick Count showed a score of 34.3-56.5. However, the final official COMELEC Canvass showed a result of 62% vs. 31% in favor of Gloria Macapagal Arroyo.

The SWS also published the number of registered voters per region as of April 28, 2004—or just a week before the elections—for the purpose of comparing their sample sizes with the actual number of voters. The ARMM had 1,057,458 voters.

However, recall that in the final official COMELEC canvass, FPJ won 31% of ARMM votes. If he had won 100% of ARMM, he could gain only 69% more of the ARMM voters, or 729,646 votes. Given that the final difference between GMA and FPJ was 1,123,576 votes, GMA would still have won the election by a total of 393,930 votes.

Even if FPJ won 100% of the ARMM, GMA would still have won. So great was GMA's lead, that even if they padded ARMM voter rolls so that it would show 1.5 million voters, 69% of that would only be 1.035 million votes, still not enough to overcome the 1.123-million vote lead.

This result is actually consistent with the trend of the pre-election opinion polls conducted also by the SWS. On April 23, just a little over two weeks before the election, the SWS released a poll, and the headline of the SWS report by itself was historically significant: "SWS April 10–17, 2004 Survey: Roco Depleted, Voters Go To GMA and Undecided". The report's first line gives away the game: "Raul Roco's sudden departure for abroad cost him almost half of his voting strength, allowing Gloria Macapagal Arroyo to gain a slim lead ..." That lead could not be reversed: at the last pre-election SWS opinion poll (conducted from May 1 to 4) released on 8 May 2004, or just two days before the election, "GMA Leads FPJ By 7%", 37% to 30%, with 12% undecided.

Voter demographics

Source: Exit polls conducted by Social Weather Stations on May 11, 99% total due to rounding error (margin of error: 2%)

Official Congressional canvass

Under the constitution, the Congress is mandated to become the National Board of Canvassers for the top two positions, the president and the vice-president. Tallying in the 216,382 precincts nationwide are submitted in Election Returns that are forwarded to the municipal and city board of canvassers. These are then tabulated and forwarded to the provincial board of canvassers which prepare the 176 Certificates of Canvass (CoC). These CoCs were forwarded to the joint session of the Congress at the Batasang Pambansa in Quezon City in May 2004.

Senators and representatives from the administration and opposition have debated heatedly on the procedure of counting the CoCs. The traditional way of counting the certificates, as used in the 1992 and 1998 elections, was to appoint a joint committee consisting of seven senators and seven representatives. Many opposition legislators, notably, Cong. Didagen Dilangalen of Maguindanao, opposed this traditional method as unconstitutional saying that it should be the whole Congress, not a committee, who should count the votes. Part of the argument was that "power delegated cannot be further delegated", referring to the delegation of counting to a committee. The proposal of some legislators was for the whole Congress to sit in a joint session counting each and every single Certificate of Canvass.

The debates and deliberations for the rules of canvassing were finished by the Congressional joint session on May 28. The rules decided were very similar to the ones used in the 1992 and 1998 elections, which called for a joint committee to act as the National Board of Canvassers. The notable difference is the increase of the number of committee members from 14 to 22, this time consisting of 11 senators and 11 representatives. The composition of the committee was also announced by the Senate President, Franklin Drilon, and the Speaker of the House, Jose de Venecia. The composition was immediately lambasted by the Opposition; the House portion of the committee consisted of 9 administration representatives and 2 opposition. The Poe camp called for a more equal representation for all the involved political parties in the committee, despite the appointed commission mirroring the current composition of the House: there are 190 administration representatives in a 220-seat House.

The official canvassing by the Congressional Joint Committee started on June 4, a little less than one month after election day. Canvassing was done in a slow pace, averaging about 12 Certificates of Canvass per day, as the Opposition accused Administration politicians of railroading the canvass. The Opposition lawyers wanted to question the validity of 25 CoCs, especially in those areas where Arroyo posted a wide margin over Poe. They wanted the committee to examine the Statement of Votes at the municipal level and even down to the Election Returns at the precinct level to prove their claim that the Certificates of Canvass have been tampered with in favor of Arroyo. Administration lawyers contend that the committee is not the proper place to lodge complaints of fraud and that the Opposition should go to the Presidential Election Tribunal (the Supreme Court) after the winner has been proclaimed.

See also
Hello Garci scandal
Commission on Elections
Politics of the Philippines
Philippine elections
President of the Philippines
13th Congress of the Philippines

External links

General sites
Philippine Presidency Project
Philippine Commission on Elections
National Movement for Free Elections (NAMFREL)

Media sites and articles
Eleksyon 2004 (Media website)
4 exit polls have 3 different winners - Philippine Daily Inquirer
Proberz exit polls: FPJ winner
Congress approves canvassing rules - Philippine Daily Inquirer
SWS admits it made errors in exit poll - Philippine Daily Inquirer

Others
On Election Polls: Part IV WHO DID BETTER - SWS OR PULSE ASIA? - Dr. Romula A. Virola
Dec. 30, 2002 Arroyo speech declaring her intention not to run
P.E.T. Case No. 003, Legarda vs. De Castro

References

 
2004
2004 elections in the Philippines